Paragorgopsis is a genus of picture-winged flies in the family Ulidiidae.

Species
 P. amoena
 P. excellens
 P. fascipennis

References

Ulidiidae